Whatstandwell is a village on the River Derwent in the Amber Valley district of Derbyshire, England.
It is about five miles south of Matlock and about four miles north of Belper. Whatstandwell railway station is located on the Derby-Matlock Derwent Valley Line, and the A6 trunk road crosses the River Derwent in the village. Most of the population is included in the civil parish of Crich but the village may be said to extend across the Derwent into the parish of Alderwasley.

History
On P. P. Burdett's map of 1791 it is shown as "Hottstandell Bridge", probably a literal spelling of the local dialect. A mid nineteenth century Ordnance Survey map shows it as "Whatstandwell Bridge" which was the name given to the railway station. The name derives from Walter Stonewell, who "held of the convent" the house next to the bridge which John de Strepul built at his own expense, in 1393.

Geography
The Cromford Canal passes through the village, which was an important transport route to and from Arkwright's Mill in the nineteenth century. The Friends Of Cromford Canal are currently seeking to reopen this navigation in full from Cromford to its junction with the Erewash Canal at Langley Mill. This area is part of the Derwent Valley Mills Heritage Site.

To the east of the village is the steep climb to Crich and the National Tramway Museum, while a short distance to the north is the former rope-worked incline of the Cromford and High Peak Railway. To the south, on the west bank of the Derwent, lie Shining Cliff Woods, which are a National Trust property — however there is no official access to this end of  the woods.

Culture and community
The village has an active social group that holds several village events each year. Currently the flagship of these is the Whatstandwell Festival held across the valley at Hankin Farm in the middle of June.  This features locally brewed real ale, local bands, games and a BBQ. The social group also organises a horticultural show, bonfire night, and a carol concert. Unfortunately the once annual raft race was abandoned due to lack of support and access issues.

There were two pubs at the turn of the century, but the Wheatsheaf is now a private residence, and the Derwent Arms is a cafe/restaurant called the Family Tree.

Whatstandwell is mentioned in the D H Lawrence novel Sons and Lovers, published 1913, in a scene in which Paul Morel and Miriam go on a day's outing: "They went on, miles and miles, to Whatstandwell. All the food was eaten, everybody was hungry, and there was very little money to get home with. But they managed to procure a loaf and a currant-loaf, which they hacked to pieces with shut-knives, and ate sitting on the wall near the bridge, watching the bright Derwent rushing by, and the brakes from Matlock pulling up at the inn."

Ellen MacArthur, the round-the-world sailor, grew up in Whatstandwell.

References

External links

Villages in Derbyshire
Towns and villages of the Peak District
Geography of Amber Valley